Estadio Daniel Villa Zapata is a multi-use stadium in Barrancabermeja, Colombia. It is currently used mostly for football matches. The stadium was originally built in 1970 with a capacity of 6,000 people. Alianza Petrolera play their home matches at this stadium. 

Built on land donated by Ecopetrol, the stadium was named after Daniel Villa Zapata, a dentist who settled in the town in the 40s and went on to become an important local leader due to his enthusiasm for sports, especially association football. It was demolished, rebuilt and expanded to seat 10,400 people between 2010 and 2015 in order to be used by Alianza Petrolera for their matches, as it did not meet safety regulations. During these years, the club played their games at several venues in the departments of Antioquia and Santander.

References

Football venues in Colombia
Sports venues completed in 1990
1990 establishments in Colombia
Alianza Petrolera F.C.